Roei Gordana (born 6 July 1990) is an Israeli footballer who plays for Hapoel Be'er Sheva. Gordana plays as a midfielder.

Early life
Gordana was born and raised in Tel Aviv, Israel, to an Israeli family of Jewish descent.

Career
Gordana played on the children system of Bnei Yehuda Tel Aviv and Maccabi Tel Aviv, and at age 14 he moved to the youth system of Hapoel Tel Aviv. On 1 September 2007, at the age of only 17, he made his debut for the senior team, at the game against Hapoel Kfar Saba at Toto Cup competition.

At the start of 2010–11 season, Gordana played 5 games at the Toto Cup, and started at the first game of the season againstHapoel Haifa. In January 2011 on loaned to Hapoel Petah Tikva. At his first game at the club, he scored his debut goal at the 3-1 win against Maccabi Tel Aviv. Gordana played 14 games at Hapoel Petah Tikva.

At the start of 2011–12 season, backed to Hapoel Tel Aviv squad. On 7 January 2012, scored his debut goal at Hapoel Tel Aviv at the win against Hapoel Be'er Sheva in Vasermil Stadium. This season the group promoted to the Group stage of UEFA Europa League. He played 30 league games, scored 2 goals and assisted 2. On 15 May 2012 he assisted the winning goal for Mirko Oremuš at the 2-1 victory against Maccabi Haifa at Israel State Cup final.

On 10 July 2014 he signed for three-year to Hapoel Be'er Sheva. On 17 July 2014 made his debut for the club at the 2014–15 against RNK Split. On 20 September 2014 he scored his debut goal for Be'er Sheva at the 1-3 away win against Hapoel Petah Tikva.

On 28 January 2016 on loaned to Maccabi Petah Tikva until the end of the season and returned to Be'er Sheva after the season.

On 16 January 2017 released from Be'er Sheva and signed to Bnei Yehuda

On 31 January 2019 signed in F.C. Ashdod.

Honours

Club
Hapoel Tel Aviv
Premier League (1): 2009–10
State Cup (2): 2009–10, 2011–12

Maccabi Petah Tikva
Toto Cup (1): 2015–16

Hapoel Be'er Sheva
State Cup (1): 2021–22
Toto Cup (1): 2016-17
Super Cup (2): 2016, 2022

Bnei Yehuda
State Cup (1): 2016–17

See also 
 List of Jewish footballers
 List of Jews in sports
 List of Israelis

References

1990 births
Israeli Jews
Living people
Israeli footballers
Israeli expatriate footballers
Hapoel Tel Aviv F.C. players
Hapoel Petah Tikva F.C. players
Hapoel Be'er Sheva F.C. players
Maccabi Petah Tikva F.C. players
Bnei Yehuda Tel Aviv F.C. players
NK Slaven Belupo players
F.C. Ashdod players
Israeli Premier League players
Croatian Football League players
Footballers from Tel Aviv
Expatriate footballers in Croatia
Israeli expatriate sportspeople in Croatia
Association football midfielders